The Portrait of a Man with a Roman Medal is a painting by the German-born Flemish artist Hans Memling, dating to c. 1480 and housed in the Royal Museum of Fine Arts, Antwerp, Belgium.

Description

The painting portrays a man from a three-quarter point of view, with an attention to details typical of Flemish painting.  The man is wearing  a black coat and a hat of the same color. In the left hand, he is showing a sestertius of emperor Nero, a symbol of his attention to Humanism. In the background is a lake landscape: Memling was one of the first painters to use natural landscapes for backgrounds of portraits (instead of the traditional black one), influencing later Renaissance artists such as Sandro Botticelli and Pietro Perugino. 

The identity of the subject is unknown. It has been supposed that he could be one of the numerous Italians living at the time in Antwerp or Bruges, who often commissioned artworks to local painters.  It has been variously identified as Bernardo Bembo, or with  the Florentine artist Niccolò di Forzore Spinelli, who died in Lyon, where the painting was in the early 19th century. Or it may be Giovanni di Candida.

See also
 Portrait of a Man with a Medal of Cosimo the Elder

References

Sources

External links

 Royal Museum of Fine Arts Antwerp: Man with a Roman Coin

Man with a Roman Medal
1480s paintings
Man with a Roman Medal
Paintings in the collection of the Royal Museum of Fine Arts Antwerp